Carolina Place Historic District is a national historic district located at Wilmington, New Hanover County, North Carolina. The district encompasses 337 contributing buildings in a predominantly residential section of Wilmington.  The district developed as Wilmington's first planned streetcar suburb between about 1906 and 1941 and includes notable examples of Queen Anne, Classical Revival, Colonial Revival, and Bungalow / American Craftsman style architecture.

It was listed on the National Register of Historic Places in 1992.

References

Houses on the National Register of Historic Places in North Carolina
Historic districts on the National Register of Historic Places in North Carolina
Queen Anne architecture in North Carolina
Colonial Revival architecture in North Carolina
Neoclassical architecture in North Carolina
Buildings and structures in Wilmington, North Carolina
National Register of Historic Places in New Hanover County, North Carolina
Houses in New Hanover County, North Carolina